The 2018–19 Saint Peter's Peacocks men's basketball team represented Saint Peter's University in the 2018–19 NCAA Division I men's basketball season. They played their home games at Yanitelli Center in Jersey City, New Jersey as members of the Metro Atlantic Athletic Conference, and were led by first-year head coach Shaheen Holloway. They finished the 2018–19 season 10–22 overall, 6–12 in MAAC play to finish in a three-way tie for ninth place. As the 9th seed in the 2019 MAAC tournament, they upset No. 8 seed Marist in the first round 71–68 in overtime before falling to No. 1 seed Iona, 71–73 in the quarterfinals.

Previous season
The Peacocks finished the 2017–18 season 14–18, 6–12 in MAAC play to finish in ninth place. As the No. 9 seed in the MAAC tournament, they defeated No. 8 seed Monmouth and upset No. 1 seed Rider to advance to the semifinals, where they lost to No. 4 seed Iona.

After the end of the season, head coach John Dunne left Saint Peter's to become the head coach at Marist. On April 10, 2018, Seton Hall assistant coach Shaheen Holloway was hired as his replacement.

Roster

Schedule and results

|-
!colspan=12 style=| Non-Conference Regular season

|-
!colspan=9 style=| MAAC regular season

|-
!colspan=12 style=| MAAC tournament
|-

|-

Source

References

Saint Peter's Peacocks men's basketball seasons
Saint Peter's Peacocks
Saint Peter's Peacocks basketball team
Saint Peter's Peacocks basketball team